Daryle Bruce Singletary (March 10, 1971 – February 12, 2018) was an American country music singer. Between 1995 and 1998, he recorded for Giant Records, for which he released three studio albums: Daryle Singletary in 1995, All Because of You in 1996 and Ain't It the Truth in 1998. In the same timespan, Singletary entered the Top 40 of the Hot Country Songs charts five times, reaching No. 2 with "I Let Her Lie" and "Amen Kind of Love", and No. 4 with "Too Much Fun".

In 2000, Singletary switched to Audium Entertainment (a division of Koch Entertainment), where he released the albums Now and Again (2000) and That's Why I Sing This Way (2002), both of which were largely composed of cover songs. A third album of covers, 2007's Straight from the Heart, was issued on the independent Shanachie Records label. He returned to E1 Music in 2010, to release Rockin' in the Country.

Early life
Daryle Singletary was born March 10, 1971, in Cairo, Georgia. His father, Roger Singletary, was a postal worker, while his mother, Anita, was a hair dresser. At an early age, he sang gospel music with his cousins and brother. Later on, in high school, he began taking vocal classes as well. In 1990, he moved to Nashville, Tennessee, in pursuit of a record deal.

In Nashville, he found work singing during open-mic nights at various venues, before finding work as a demo singer. One of the demos that Singletary sang was "An Old Pair of Shoes", which Randy Travis eventually recorded. Travis recommended Singletary to his management team, who helped him sign to a recording contract with Giant Records.

Career

1995–1996: Self-titled album
Singletary's self-titled debut album was released in 1995. The lead-off single, "I'm Living Up to Her Low Expectations", spent one week in the Top 40 on the Billboard country charts, peaking at No. 39. It was followed by his biggest hit, the No. 2 "I Let Her Lie". This album also produced the No. 4 "Too Much Fun" and finally "Working It Out" at No. 50. Despite the two Top Five hits it produced, the album sold poorly and reached No. 44 on Top Country Albums. The album was produced by David Malloy, James Stroud and Randy Travis.

1996–1997: All Because of You
A second album for Giant, All Because of You, was released in 1996. Although its lead-off single "Amen Kind of Love" became his second No. 2 hit that year, the album's other two tracks — "The Used to Be's" and "Even the Wind" — both fell short of Top 40, peaking at number 48 and 68 respectively.

1998–1999: Ain't It the Truth
Ain't It the Truth, his third and final album for Giant, produced a minor hit in "The Note", which peaked at No. 28 on the country charts and No. 90 on the Billboard Hot 100. Despite this song's minor crossover success, however, this album also saw its second and third singles miss the Top 40, and Singletary was dropped from Giant's roster.

2000–2001: Now and Again
In 2000, Singletary signed to Audium/Koch Entertainment to release his fourth album, 2000's Now and Again. This album's lead-off single was a cover of Savage Garden's 1999 pop single "I Knew I Loved You". Following it were "I've Thought of Everything" at No. 70, and the album's title track, which failed to chart.

2002–2003: That's Why I Sing This Way
His second album for Audium/Koch, That's Why I Sing This Way, was mostly a cover album save for the title track. Both "That's Why I Sing This Way" and a cover of Conway Twitty's "I'd Love to Lay You Down" were released from this album, respectively reaching No. 47 and No. 43.

2003–2018: Later years
After Audium/Koch closed its country division, Singletary signed to Shanachie Records. His first project for the label was a second album, 2007's Straight from the Heart, which was also largely composed of cover songs. Its singles, "I Still Sing This Way" and "Jesus & Bartenders", both failed to chart.

In 2009, Singletary returned to Koch under the label's new name of E1 Music. He released his next single, "Love You With the Lights On" in February. The single was the lead-off single to a new album, Rockin' in the Country, released in June 2009.

Death
Singletary died unexpectedly at his home in Lebanon, Tennessee, on the morning of February 12, 2018. The cause of death was not revealed. Later that same year, Platinum Records Nashville released a posthumous single titled "She's Been Cheatin' on Us". Although the label announced that the song's proceeds were to benefit his family, a representative of the singer stated that no such fund existed, and that the recording was a demo that was never meant to be released.

Discography

Studio albums

Collaboration albums

Compilation albums

Singles

Music videos

References

External links

1971 births
2018 deaths
American country singer-songwriters
American male singer-songwriters
MNRK Music Group artists
Giant Records (Warner) artists
People from Cairo, Georgia
Country musicians from Georgia (U.S. state)
Singer-songwriters from Georgia (U.S. state)
Deaths from blood clot